Keşrobası is a village in the Yavuzeli District, Gaziantep Province, Turkey.

References

Villages in Yavuzeli District